Nina is a 1956 West German drama film directed by Rudolf Jugert and starring Anouk Aimée, Karlheinz Böhm and Peter Carsten.

The film's sets were designed by the art director Erich Kettelhut. Based on the 1954 novel Romeo and Juliet in Vienna by Milo Dor and Reinhard Federmann, it premiered in Hannover.

Synopsis
In Vienna at the height of the Cold War, an American journalist falls in love with a secretary working for the Soviets, a relationship that ultimately ends in tragedy.

Cast
 Anouk Aimée as Nina Iwanowa
 Karlheinz Böhm as Frank Wilson
 Peter Carsten as Major Tubaljow
 Werner Hinz as Oberst Kapulowski
 Carl Wery as Hofrat Lorenz
 Annie Rosar as Therese
 Kurt Fuß as Französischer Kulturreferent
 Franz Heigl as Ober bei Schmiedl
 Karin Himboldt as Mabel
 Günther Jerschke as Leutnant Sergejeff
 Marina Ried as Frau Sergejeff
 Hilde Schreiber as Sekretärin bei Frank
 Edward Tierney as Eddy Cunningham 
 Wilhelm Walter as Der Tierarzt

References

Bibliography
 Bock, Hans-Michael & Bergfelder, Tim. The Concise CineGraph. Encyclopedia of German Cinema. Berghahn Books, 2009.
 Goble, Alan. The Complete Index to Literary Sources in Film. Walter de Gruyter, 1999.

External links 

1956 films
1956 drama films
1950s German-language films
Films directed by Rudolf Jugert
Bavaria Film films
West German films
Films set in Vienna
Cold War films
1950s German films
German drama films
German black-and-white films